Qualification for the 1991 FIBA European Championship, commonly called FIBA EuroBasket 1991 took place between 9 May 1989 and 5 December 1990. A total of eight teams qualified for the tournament.

Format
A total of 27 teams participated. Competition consisted of two stages:

A Qualifying Round that consisted of nineteen teams divided into four round robin tournaments that took place in Oslo-Norway, Olomouc-Czechoslovakia, Osnabrück-Federal Republic of Germany and Anadia-Portugal between 9 May and 15 May 1989.
A Challenge Round where the first and second place teams from each of the four groups from the Qualifying Round joined another eight teams. All sixteen teams were then divided into four round robin groups of four teams each. This stage took place between 22 November 1989, and 5 December 1990, with the competition consisting of home and away legs taking place in each of the participating countries. The top two teams from each group qualified for EuroBasket 1991.

Qualifying round

Group A (Oslo, Norway)

|}
Rules=1) Points; 2) Head-to-head results; 3) Points difference; 4) Points scored.

Group B (Olomouc - Czechoslovakia)

|}

Group C (Osnabrück - Federal Republic of Germany)

|}

Group D (Anadia - Portugal)

|}

Challenge Round

Group A

|}

Group B

|}
Rules=1) Points; 2) Head-to-head results; 3) Points difference; 4) Points scored.

Group C

|}
Rules=1) Points; 2) Head-to-head results; 3) Points difference; 4) Points scored.

After the reunification of Germany on 3 October 1990, the former Federal Republic of Germany is renamed Germany before the second leg.

Group D

|}

External links

qualification
1989–90 in European basketball
1990–91 in European basketball
1991–92 in European basketball
1991